Eleanor Alice Hibbert (née Burford; 1 September 1906 – 18 January 1993) was an English writer of historical romances. She was a prolific writer who published several books a year in different literary genres, each genre under a different pen name: Jean Plaidy for fictionalized history of European royalty, Victoria Holt for gothic romances, and Philippa Carr for a multi-generational family saga. She also wrote light romances, crime novels, murder mysteries and thrillers under pseudonyms Eleanor Burford, Elbur Ford, Kathleen Kellow, Anna Percival, and Ellalice Tate.

In 1989, the Romance Writers of America gave her the Golden Treasure award in recognition of her contributions to the romance genre. By the time of her death, she had written more than 200 books that sold more than 100 million copies and had been translated into 20 languages. She continues to be a widely borrowed author among British libraries.

Personal life

 

Hibbert was born Eleanor Alice Burford on 1 September 1906 at 20 Burke Street, Canning Town, now part of the London borough of Newham. She inherited a love of reading from her father, Joseph Burford, a dock labourer. Her mother was Alice Louise Burford, née Tate.

When she was quite young, her health forced her to be privately educated at home. At the age of 16 she went to a business college, where she studied shorthand, typewriting, and languages. She then worked for a jeweller in Hatton Garden, where she weighed gems and typed. She also worked as a language interpreter in a café for French and German-speaking tourists.

In her early twenties she married George Percival Hibbert (c. 1886–1966), a wholesale leather merchant about twenty years older than herself, who shared her love of books and reading. She was his second wife. During World War II, the Hibberts lived in a cottage in Cornwall that looked out over a bay called Plaidy Beach.

Between 1974 and 1978, Eleanor Hibbert bought a 13th-century manor house in Sandwich, Kent that she named King's Lodging because she believed that it had served previously as lodging for English monarchs Henry VIII and Elizabeth I. The house had carved fireplaces and a staircase from the Tudor period. Hibbert restored the house and furnished it opulently but soon found it too big for her taste and too far from London.

She then moved to a two-storey penthouse apartment at Albert Court, Kensington Gore, London that overlooked the Royal Albert Hall and Hyde Park. She shared her apartment with Mrs Molly Pascoe, a companion who also travelled with her.

In 1985, Hibbert sold King's Lodging.

Hibbert spent her summers in her cottage near Plaidy Beach in Cornwall. To get away from the cold English winter, Hibbert would sail around the world on board a cruise ship three months a year from January to April. The cruise would take her to exotic destinations like Egypt and Australia, locations that she later incorporated into her novels. She sailed to Sydney aboard the cruise ship Oronsay in 1970, and the Canberra in 1978.

Towards the end of her life, her eyesight started failing.

Eleanor Hibbert died on 18 January 1993 on the cruise ship Sea Princess somewhere between Athens, Greece and Port Said, Egypt and was buried at sea. A memorial service was later held on 6 March 1993, at St Peter's Anglican Church, Kensington Park Road, London.

Writing career

Literary influences

Eleanor Hibbert grew up in London. She first discovered her fascination for the past when she visited Hampton Court in her teenage years. After her marriage, Hibbert achieved the financial independence she needed to realise her desire to write. London's historic monuments and royal personalities filled Hibbert's historical novels. She was also influenced by her regular visits to British historic homes and their architecture.

During World War II, the Hibberts lived in Cornwall, whose pebble beaches, high cliffs and treacherous blue waters served as the setting for many of the Victoria Holt gothic novels.

In later life, Hibbert took a world cruise every year. Her ship called in ports of countries like Turkey, Egypt, India, South Africa, Hong Kong, Ceylon and Australia. These exotic destinations serve as the backdrop in later Victoria Holt novels. In the late 1960s, Hibbert spent two months visiting the Australian goldfields 40 miles north of Melbourne, research for her 1971 Victoria Holt novel, The Shadow of the Lynx. In 1972, Hibbert travelled from Sydney to Melbourne via the Snowy Mountains and visited Hobart, Launceston, Geelong, Ballarat and Bendigo.

Hibbert's Philippa Carr novels were based partly in Cornwall and partly in Australia.

Hibbert was influenced in her writing by the Brontës (especially the novel Jane Eyre), George Eliot, Charles Dickens, Victor Hugo, and Leo Tolstoy.

Early work
During the 1930s, Hibbert wrote nine long novels (each about 150,000 words in length), all of them serious psychological studies of contemporary life. However, none of these were accepted for publication. At the same time, she wrote short stories for newspapers such as the Daily Mail and Evening News. Some also appeared in The Star, Woman's Realm and Ladies' Home Journal. The turning point came when fiction editor of the Daily Mail told her, "You're barking up the wrong tree: you must write something which is saleable, and the easiest way is to write romantic fiction."

Hibbert read 50 romance novels as research and then published her first fiction book, Daughter of Anna, in 1941. It was a period novel set in Australia of the late 18th and 19th centuries. It was a moderate success and Hibbert received £30 as advance for it. The book was published under her maiden name, Eleanor Burford, which was also used for her contemporary novels. Following the success of the book, Hibbert was contracted by Herbert Jenkins publishers to write one book a year. By 1961 Hibbert had published 31 novels under this name, including ten romance novels for Mills & Boon.

Pseudonyms

In 1945, she chose the pseudonym Jean Plaidy for her new novel Together They Ride at the request of her agent. The name was inspired by Plaidy Beach near the Hibberts' home in Looe, Cornwall during World War II. Her agent suggested the first name, saying "Jean doesn't take much room at the back of the book". The book was published by Gerald G. Swan, a London publisher. The next book written under the Jean Plaidy pseudonym was Beyond the Blue Mountains in 1948. The publisher Robert Hale accepted the 500-page manuscript after it had been rejected by several others. The firm wrote to Hibbert's literary agency, A.M. Heath, "Will you tell this author that there are glittering prizes ahead for those who can write as she does?". In 1949, Hibbert hit her stride with the first Jean Plaidy novel that fictionalized stories of royalty: The King's Pleasure, featuring Henry VIII and Anne Boleyn. A total of 91 Jean Plaidy novels were published. Hibbert's last Jean Plaidy book, The Rose Without a Thorn, was published posthumously.

Hibbert also wrote four non-fiction books under the pseudonym Jean Plaidy. The first, A Triptych of Poisoners (1958), was a collection of short biographies of poisoners: Cesare Borgia, Marie d'Aubray and Edward William Pritchard. The other three were a trilogy on the Spanish Inquisition: The Rise (1959), The Growth (1960) and The End (1961).

From 1950 to 1953, Hibbert wrote four novels as Elbur Ford, a pen name derived from her maiden name, Eleanor Burford. These novels were based on real-life murderers of the nineteenth century:  Edward William Pritchard (Flesh and the Devil, 1950); Adelaide Bartlett (Poison in Pimlico, 1950); Euphrasie Mercier (The Bed Disturbed, 1952) and Constance Kent (Such Bitter Business, 1953 – published in the U.S. in 1954 under the title Evil in the House).

Between 1952 and 1960, Hibbert used the pseudonym Kathleen Kellow to write eight novels that were mostly crime and mystery fiction. From 1956 to 1961, she wrote five novels as Ellalice Tate, a pseudonym inspired by her mother's name, Alice Tate.

In 1960, at the suggestion of her agent, Patricia Schartle Myrer, she wrote her first Gothic romance, Mistress of Mellyn, under the name Victoria Holt. The pseudonym was created by choosing the name Victoria for its regal, romantic ring while the name Holt was taken from the military bank of Holt & Company where Hibbert had an account. Published by Doubleday in the United States and Collins in the United Kingdom, Mistress of Mellyn became an instant international bestseller and revived the Gothic romantic suspense genre.

Mistress of Mellyn was a clever weaving of elements from earlier Gothic novels such as Jane Eyre (1847), The Woman in White (1859), and Rebecca (1938). Its setting in Cornwall made the resemblance to Rebecca (1938) so remarkable that it was speculated that Victoria Holt was a pseudonym for Daphne du Maurier. After six Victoria Holt novels were published over eight years, it was revealed that Hibbert was the author. Hibbert wrote a further 31 novels as Victoria Holt, primarily portraying fictitious characters set against an authentic period background, usually of the late 19th century. The last Victoria Holt novel, The Black Opal, was published after her death.

In 1960, Hibbert wrote a novel under the name Anna Percival, a pseudonym inspired by her husband's middle name, Percival. Hibbert never used that pen name again.

She created her last pseudonym, Philippa Carr, in 1972 at the suggestion of her publisher, Collins, to create a new series showing successive generations of English gentlewomen involved in important historical events starting with the Reformation and ending with World War II.

Hibbert continued to use the pseudonym Jean Plaidy for her historical novels about the crowned heads of Europe. Her books written under this pseudonym were popular with the general public and were also hailed by critics and historians for their historical accuracy, quality of writing, and attention to detail.

Research
Hibbert based her research on the writings of British historians such as John Speed, James Anthony Froude, Alexander Fraser Tytler and Agnes Strickland.

Each of Hibbert's Jean Plaidy books featured a bibliography at the end, listing the historical works consulted during the process of writing the book.
 
The Kensington Central Library gave Hibbert special concessions to aid her research. She was allowed to go down to the vault where the out-of-circulation books were stored, and borrow them a trolley-load at a time. She was even allowed to take the books home and keep them as long as she wanted.

When her eyesight started failing towards the end of her life, she borrowed audiobooks from the Westminster City Council public libraries.

Writing discipline
Hibbert was a prolific writer, churning out multiple books in a year under different pseudonyms, chiefly Jean Plaidy, Victoria Holt and Philippa Carr. Jean Plaidy proved very popular in the United Kingdom, selling large quantities in paperback while Victoria Holt was a bestseller in the United States. Many of her readers never realized that behind all these pen names was a single author.

Hibbert attributed her large output to her regular working habits. She described herself as a compulsive writer and would write all seven days in the week. She started every morning at the typewriter on her desk, usually completing five thousand words by lunchtime. Though writing stimulated her, she found the typewriter to be a physical strain. She devoted five hours every day to her writing, in addition to the time that it took her to proof-read her draft and conduct research. In the afternoon, she would personally answer all the fan mail she received. She would also spend time at Kensington Central Library. In the evening, she played chess if she could find an opponent or attended social engagements.

Even while on her annual cruise around the world, Hibbert maintained her discipline. She wrote in the mornings, played chess in the afternoons, and joined in the shipboard entertainments in the evenings. She preferred to work on her Victoria Holt novels while on board the cruise ship because they did not require as much research or fact-checking at a library.

Literary agents and publishers 
Eleanor Hibbert enjoyed healthy, lifelong relationships with her literary agents and publishers, a rare feat in the publishing world. She was represented in the United Kingdom by A.M. Heath Literary Agency and by McIntosh & Otis in the United States. Her long-time American agent was Patricia Schartle Myrer followed by Julie Fallowfield.

London publisher Herbert Jenkins published 20 light romantic novels from 1941 to 1955 that Hibbert wrote under the pen name Eleanor Burford. The contract, initially for one book a year at an advance of £30 a title, was later revised to two books a year when the books proved successful.

Mills and Boon, a London publisher that specialised in low-priced, paperback, romantic novels brought out 10 romance novels from 1956 to 1962 that Hibbert wrote under the pen name Eleanor Burford.

Gerald G Swan published the first Jean Plaidy book in 1945 but every one after that was published by Robert Hale. Starting with Beyond the Blue Mountains (1948) and extending over the entire course of her lifetime, Robert Hale published a total of 90 Jean Plaidy books in hardcover with dust jackets illustrated by specialist artist Philip Gough.

MacRae Smith Co. of Philadelphia published Jean Plaidy titles in the United States. Foreign language editions of Jean Plaidy books began appearing in 1956: in French by Éditions Robert Laffont, Paris; in Spanish by Guillermo Kraft Limitada, Buenos Aires; and in Dutch by Uitgeverij A.J. Luitingh, Amsterdam.

In 1951, Canadian paperback publishers Harlequin reprinted Jean Plaidy'''s Beyond the Blue Mountains in paperback to achieve their greatest commercial success to that date: of the 30,000 copies sold, only 48 were returned.

Robert Hale published eight Kathleen Kellow crime and mystery novels between 1952 and 1960 in hardcover with dust jackets by Philip Gough. Robert Hale also published the sole book written under the Anna Percival pseudonym, The Brides of Lanlory.

From 1950 to 1953, four Elbur Ford crime novels were published by London publisher William Morrow in the United Kingdom and New York publisher Werner Laurie in the United States.

From 1956 to 1961, Hodder & Stoughton published all five historical novels written under the pseudonym Ellalice Tate.

From 1960 to 1993, Hibbert wrote 32 Victoria Holt novels for the publishing giants Collins in the United Kingdom and Doubleday in the United States. Many of them were bestsellers and were translated into 20 languages to reach a worldwide audience.

From 1972 to 1993, Hibbert wrote 19 Philippa Carr novels that were published by Collins in the United Kingdom and Putnam in the United States. A few of them were later translated into foreign languages such as Spanish, Finnish, Russian and Polish.

By the time of her death in 1993, Hibbert had sold 75 million books translated in 20 languages under the name Victoria Holt, 14 million under the name Jean Plaidy and 3 million under the name Philippa Carr.

After her death, Mark Hamilton of the A.M. Heath Literary Agency took over as executor for her literary estate, estimated to be worth about £8,790,807 at probate.

Eleanor Burford

Romance novels
The book The Love Child published in 1950 by Eleanor Burford must not be mistaken for the same-titled novel by Philippa Carr published in 1978 as part of the Daughters of England Series.

Mills & Boon novels

The Mary Stuart Queen of Scots Series
 Royal Road to Fotheringay (1955) (later re-published under the Jean Plaidy name)

Jean Plaidy

Many Jean Plaidy books were published under different titles in the United States. Her trilogies were also later re-published as single books, often under different titles than those shown.

Single novels

Omnibus
 Katharine of Aragon (omnibus of novels 2 – 4 in The Tudor Saga)
 Catherine De Medici (1969)
 Charles II (omnibus of novels 2 – 4 in The Stuart Saga)
 Isabella and Ferdinand (1970)

The Tudor Saga

The Catherine De Medici Trilogy
 Madame Serpent (1951)
 The Italian Woman (1952) (a.k.a. The Unholy Woman)
 Queen Jezebel (1953)

The Mary Stuart, Queen of Scots Series
 Royal Road to Fotheringay (1955) (first published as being by Eleanor Burford)
 The Captive Queen of Scots (1963)

The Stuart Saga

The French Revolution Series
 Louis the Well Beloved (1959)
 The Road to Compiègne (1959)
 Flaunting, Extravagant Queen (1957)

The Lucrezia Borgia Series

 Madonna of the Seven Hills (1958)
 Light on Lucrezia (1958)

The Isabella and Ferdinand Trilogy
 Castile for Isabella (1960)
 Spain for the Sovereigns (1960)
 Daughters of Spain (1961) (a.k.a. Royal Sisters)

The Georgian Saga

The Queen Victoria Series

The Norman Trilogy
 The Bastard King (1974)
 The Lion of Justice (1975)
 The Passionate Enemies (1976)

The Plantagenet Saga

The Queens of England Series

Children's novels
 Meg Roper, daughter of Sir Thomas More (1961)
 The Young Elizabeth (1961)
 The Young Mary Queen of Scots (1962)

The Spanish Inquisition Series (non-fiction)
 The Rise of the Spanish Inquisition (1959)
 The Growth of the Spanish Inquisition (1960)
 The End of the Spanish Inquisition (1961)

Historical non-fiction
 A Triptych of Poisoners (1958)
 Mary Queen of Scots: The Fair Devil of Scotland (1975)

Reception and legacy

 20th century Jean Plaidy historical novels were welcomed by readers who found them to be an easy way to gain insight into a sweeping panorama of European history.

It was common for school girls in England to read these in history lessons, whilst hiding them behind their proper text books.

In the last decade of the 20th century, historical fiction went out of fashion. Jean Plaidy titles went out of print.

 21st century 
In October 2001, Rachel Kahan, associate editor at Crown Publishing Group, and Jean Plaidy fan since childhood, discovered that Jean Plaidy books had gone out of print in the United States.

Kahan bought the reprint rights to ten Jean Plaidy novels. In April 2003, Crown chose to publish two books under the Three Rivers Press imprint, both featuring Henry VIII. The Lady in the Tower and The Rose Without a Thorn tell the story of two of his six wives, Anne Boleyn and Catherine Howard, both of whom were beheaded. The books were published in paperback with new titles, modern covers and a readers' guide at the back. The first printing of 30,000 copies of each book sold out in 3 months. Based on this success, Crown's United Kingdom unit, Arrow Books, bought the entire Jean Plaidy backlist.

Reprints

 Three Rivers Press editions 
In the Spring of 2003 Three Rivers Press, an imprint of U.S.A. publisher Crown Publishing Group, started republishing Jean Plaidy's stories. Three Rivers Press published some of the books with new titles which are listed here:
 Mary, Queen of Scotland: The triumphant year (23 November 2004) previously published as Royal Road to Fotheringay (1955) by Eleanor Burford.
 The Loves of Charles II (25 October 2005) is an omnibus that collects The Wandering Prince (1956), A Health Unto His Majesty (1956), and Here Lies Our Sovereign Lord (1957).
 Loyal in Love (23 October 2007) previously published as Myself My Enemy (1983).
 The Merry Monarch's Wife (22 January 2008) previously published as The Pleasures of Love (1991).
 The Queen's Devotion (26 August 2008) previously published as William's Wife (1990).
 To Hold the Crown (7 October 2008) previously published as Uneasy Lies the Head (1982). 
 The King's Confidante (7 April 2009) previously published as Saint Thomas' Eve (1954).
 For a Queen's Love (2 March 2010) previously published as The Spanish Bridegroom (1954).
 A Favorite of the Queen (2 March 2010) previously published as Gay Lord Robert (1955).

 Elbur Ford

Kathleen Kellow

Some of these novels were re-published under the Jean Plaidy name.

 Ellalice Tate

All these novels were later re-published under the Jean Plaidy name.

Anna Percival

 The Brides of Lanlory, 1960

 Victoria Holt

Single novels

Anthologies in collaboration
 "The Bride of Pendorric" in Three Great Romantic Stories (1972) (with Hebe Elsna and Lucy Walker)

 Reception and legacy 

 20th century Victoria Holt books proved popular with the reading public and many of them made it to bestseller lists. Hibbert won loyalty from large numbers of women readers who passed along their copies to the next generation of women in their family. Hibbert described her heroines as "women of integrity and strong character" who were "struggling for liberation, fighting for their own survival."

Her 1960 novel Mistress of Mellyn single-handedly revived the Gothic romance genre. Many women started writing their own gothic romances. Even male authors like Tom E. Huff and Julian Fellowes succumbed to the trend and wrote romances under female pseudonyms.Victoria Holt novels became best-sellers. In 1970, when gothic mania was at its peak, The Secret Woman became one of the top 10 best-selling books in the United States. By 1975, a Victoria Holt paperback began with a first printing of 800,000 copies.

By the early 1970s gothic novels outsold all other genres in paperback fiction, including mysteries, science fiction and Westerns. This coincided with consolidation within the publishing industry where paperbacks and hardcover publishers were brought together under the same corporate parent for the first time. More sophisticated marketing efforts led to placement in grocery and drugstore checkout aisles, where they found their target audience: educated, middle-class women with a reading habit.

Hibbert's romance novels were clean; at the most the main characters exchanged smouldering looks of longing. However, by 1969 the sexual revolution had made explicit description more acceptable. In April 1972, the romance novel The Flame and the Flower took advantage of this change in trend and revolutionized the historical romance genre by detailing physical intimacy between the protagonists. Another such novel, Sweet Savage Love, that followed in 1974 cemented the trend. A new genre was thus born, dubbed the 'sweet savage romance' or the 'bodice ripper' because of the heaving, partly exposed bosom often pictured on the cover.

Interest in Hibbert's clean romances declined. In 1976, a critic complained that Victoria Holt's heroines "must be a little bit dumb or they won't get themselves into such improbable messes in the first place." The next Victoria Holt novel, The Devil on Horseback (1977), was described as "from another era, sort of out of step with today's style." Critics judged the books as falling "short of her previous standards."

By the early 1980s, Gothic romances were no longer as popular as a decade earlier. Readers demanded more sex and adventure in their romance novels. Publishers created paperback imprints like Silhouette and Candlelight Ecstasy simply to satisfy the enormous demand for "bodice rippers" and "hot historicals".

Bowing to the changing times, Hibbert wrote The Demon Lover, a 1982 Victoria Holt novel, in a style that borrowed several elements from the plot of Sweet Savage Love: forced seduction of a naive girl by a powerful man ending in marriage, set against a background of turmoil in war time. Critics congratulated the move: "Her latest, 'The Demon Lover', is a straight romance with sexual passion, which is currently 'in'. It has no suspense: the thrilling twists and turns of plot that marked her Gothic novels are no more."

Victoria Holt's heroines left the decorous drawing rooms of Victorian England to find adventure in far more exotic locations: inside an Egyptian pyramid (The Curse of the Kings, 1973); among Chinese antiques in Hong Kong (The House of a Thousand Lanterns, 1974); down the opal mines of Australia (The Pride of the Peacock, 1976); on a tea plantation in Ceylon (The Spring of the Tiger, 1979); among lush, tropical islands off the coast of Australia (The Road to Paradise Island, 1985); in Crimea with Florence Nightingale (Secret for a Nightingale, 1986); in mutiny-filled British India (The India Fan, 1988); in a Turkish nobleman's harem in Constantinople (The Captive, 1989); in the British colonies of South Africa (Snare of Serpents, 1990); and on a shipwreck in the South Sea Islands (The Black Opal, 1993).

In 1993, Hibbert died. In the closing years of the 20th century, Victoria Holt titles were made available in large print, audiobook and Braille formats. Translations in several European languages, Russian, Hebrew, Persian, Chinese, Korean, Thai, Vietnamese and Japanese also appeared.

 21st century 
In 2006, London publisher Harper reprinted four of Victoria Holt's most popular titles with new covers: Mistress of Mellyn (1961), The Shivering Sands (1969), The Shadow of the Lynx (1971) and The Time of the Hunter's Moon (1983). Foreign language translations in European languages, Japanese, Sinhalese and Thai were also published that year.

Philippa Carr

Daughters of England Series

Single novels
 Daughters of England'' (1995)

References

External links
 Eleanor Alice Burford Hibbert "Queen of Romantic Suspense"
 Jean Plaidy's Royal Intrigue – Fan page by Arleigh Ordoyne
 Jean Plaidy novels by publisher Random House
 Victoria Holt novels by publisher Macmillan
 Philippa Carr novels by publisher Open Road Media
 Bookbug on the Web: Victoria Holt
 Books by Jean Plaidy
 Victoria Holt's Yahoogroup

1906 births
1993 deaths
20th-century English people
20th-century English novelists
20th-century English women writers
British romantic fiction writers
English historical novelists
English romantic fiction writers
English women novelists
RITA Award winners
Writers of historical fiction set in the Middle Ages
Writers of historical fiction set in the early modern period
Writers of historical romances
Writers from London
Women mystery writers
Burials at sea
Women romantic fiction writers
Women historical novelists
People from Canning Town
Writers of Gothic fiction